"All Creatures of Our God and King" is an English Christian hymn by William Henry Draper, based on a poem by St. Francis of Assisi. It was first published in a hymn book in 1919.

History 
The words of the hymn were initially written by St. Francis of Assisi in 1225 in the Canticle of the Sun poem, which was based on Psalm 148. The words were translated into English by William Draper, who at the time was rector of a Church of England parish church at Adel near Leeds. Draper paraphrased the words of the Canticle and set them to music. It is not known when Draper first wrote the hymn but it was between 1899 and 1919. Draper wrote it for his church's children's Whitsun festival celebrations and it was later published in 1919 in the Public School Hymn Book.  The hymn is currently used in 179 different hymn books. The words written by St Francis are some of the oldest used in hymns after "Father We Praise Thee", written in 580 AD.

Like "Ye Watchers and Ye Holy Ones", Draper's text is usually set to the tune of "", a German Easter hymn published by Friedrich Spee in 1623 in his book . This tune became widespread in English hymn books starting with a 1906 arrangement by Ralph Vaughan Williams. John Rutter also wrote a piece of music for the hymn. Despite the hymn being initially written by Draper for Whitsun (the Anglican and English designation for Pentecost), it is mostly used in the earlier weeks of the Easter season.

Melody
The most common melody is the 1623 German hymn tune . The following setting is from the 1906 English Hymnal, with the lyrics quoted from the 1986 New English Hymnal:

In popular culture 
In the United Kingdom, the hymn was prominently featured in the pilot episode of the comedy programme Mr. Bean, where the title character is in church when the congregation sings "All Creatures of Our God and King", but he has no hymnal and his neighbour refuses to share. The only lyric he can participate in is the recurrent "Alleluia".

In the United States, it was covered by the David Crowder Band on the album Can You Hear Us? in 2002.

References

External links 

English Christian hymns
Francis of Assisi
Songs based on poems
20th-century hymns
Christianity and nature